James Franklin (born 1953 in Sydney) is an Australian philosopher, mathematician and historian of ideas.

Life and career
Franklin was educated at St. Joseph's College, Hunters Hill, New South Wales. His undergraduate work was at the University of Sydney (1971–74), where he attended St John's College and he was influenced by philosophers David Stove and David Armstrong. He completed his PhD in 1981 at the University of Warwick, on algebraic groups. Since 1981 he has taught in the School of Mathematics and Statistics at the University of New South Wales.

His research areas include the philosophy of mathematics and the 'formal sciences', the history of probability, Australian Catholic history, the parallel between ethics and mathematics, restraint, the quantification of rights in applied ethics, and the analysis of extreme risk. Franklin is the literary executor of David Stove.

He is a Fellow of the Royal Society of New South Wales.

History of ideas

His 2001 book, The Science of Conjecture: Evidence and Probability Before Pascal, covered the development of thinking about uncertain evidence over many centuries up to 1650. Its central theme was ancient and medieval work on the law of evidence, which developed concepts like half-proof, similar to modern proof beyond reasonable doubt, as well as analyses of aleatory contracts like insurance and gambling. The book was praised by N.N. Taleb.

His polemical history of Australian philosophy, Corrupting the Youth (2003), praised the Australian realist tradition in philosophy and attacked postmodernist and relativist trends.

Philosophy of mathematics

In the philosophy of mathematics, Franklin defends an Aristotelian realist theory, according to which mathematics is about certain real features of the world, namely the quantitative and structural features (such as ratios and symmetry). The theory is developed in his 2014 book An Aristotelian Realist Philosophy of Mathematics: Mathematics as the Science of Quantity and Structure. The theory stands in opposition to both Platonism and nominalism, and emphasises applied mathematics and mathematical modelling as the most philosophically central parts of mathematics. He is the founder of the Sydney School in the philosophy of mathematics.   Over the years, the School has hosted emerging Australasian researchers and philosophers such as Anne Newstead, Lisa Dive, and Jeremiah Joven Joaquin. Paul Thagard writes that "the current philosophy of mathematics that fits best with what is known about minds and science is James Franklin's Aristotelian realism."

In the philosophy of probability, he argues for an objective Bayesian view according to which the relation of evidence to conclusion is strictly a matter of logic. An example is evidence for and against conjectures in pure mathematics. His book What Science Knows: And How It Knows It develops the philosophy of science from an objective Bayesian viewpoint.

Ethics
His work on the parallel between ethics and mathematics received the 2005 Eureka Prize for Research in Ethics.

In 1998 he set up and taught for ten years a course on Professional Issues and Ethics in Mathematics at UNSW.

He conducted the "Restraint Project", a study of the virtue of temperance or self-control in Australia. In 2008 he set up the Australian Database of Indigenous Violence.

His book, The Worth of Persons: The Foundation of Ethics, appeared in 2022.

Philosophy of religion
Franklin has defended Pascal's Wager and Leibniz's Best of all possible worlds theory, and has discussed emergentism as an alternative to materialist atheism and theism.

Australian Catholic history

He is the editor of the Journal of the Australian Catholic Historical Society. His books on Australian Catholic history are Catholic Values and Australian Values (2006),The Real Archbishop Mannix (2015, with G.O.Nolan and M. Gilchrist) and Catholic Thought and Catholic Action: Scenes from Australian Catholic Life (2023). He has written also on the Catholic sexual abuse crisis, Magdalen laundries, missions to Aboriginal Australians, and the virtuous life of Catholic rural communities.

Publications
Franklin has written several books and articles:
 1996 and 2011, Proof in Mathematics: An Introduction , originally published as Introduction to Proofs in Mathematics, in 1988.
 2001, repr. 2015, The Science of Conjecture: Evidence and Probability Before Pascal, ;
 2003, Corrupting the Youth: A History of Philosophy in Australia, ;
 2006, Catholic Values and Australian Realities, ;
 2007, Life to the Full: Rights and Social Justice in Australia, (edited) 
 2009, What Science Knows: And How It Knows It 
 2014, An Aristotelian Realist Philosophy of Mathematics, 
 2015, The Real Archbishop Mannix: From the Sources, 
 2022, The Worth of Persons: The Foundation of Ethics, 
 2023, Catholic Thought and Catholic Action: Scenes from Australian Catholic Life, 

Articles (a selection):
 1982, The Renaissance Myth, Quadrant 26 (11):51–60.
 1994, The formal sciences discover the philosophers’stone, in: Studies in History and Philosophy of Science, Volume 25, No. 4, 513–533, Elsevier Science Ltd.
 2000, in: The New Criterion, Volume 18, No. 10, June 2000.
 2000, Diagrammatic reasoning and modelling in the imagination: the secret weapons of the Scientific Revolution, in: 1543 and All That: Image and Word, Change and Continuity in the Proto-Scientific Revolution, ed. G. Freeland & A. Corones, Dordrecht: Kluwer, 53–115.
 2003, "The representation of context: ideas from artificial intelligence" in: Law, Probability and Risk 2, 191–199.
 2006, Chapter on 'Artifice and the natural world: Mathematics, logic, technology', in: Cambridge History of Eighteenth Century Philosophy, ed. K. Haakonssen, Cambridge, 2006, 817–853.
 2010, The postmodern calculus, New Criterion 29 (1) (Sept 2010), 75-80.
 2022, Mathematics, a Core Part of Classical Education, Australian Classical Education Society, (2 July 2022).
 2022, The Global/Local Distinction Vindicates Leibniz’s Theodicy, Theology and Science, Vol.20, No.4, (October 2022), pp.445-462.

See also
 Ethics in mathematics
 Continuity thesis

References

External links
James Franklin home page
Google scholar profile
Philpapers profile
The "Sydney School" in the philosophy of mathematics
Australian Database of Indigenous Violence (archived 18 Aug 2020)

1953 births
Alumni of the University of Warwick
Australian historians
Australian philosophers
Australian Roman Catholics
Historians of mathematics
Living people
People educated at St Joseph's College, Hunters Hill
Philosophers of mathematics
Structuralism (philosophy of mathematics)
Academic staff of the University of New South Wales
University of Sydney alumni